Congo, officially Republic of the Congo competed at the 2020 Summer Olympics in Tokyo. Originally scheduled to take place from 24 July to 9 August 2020, the Games were postponed to 23 July to 8 August 2021, due to the COVID-19 pandemic. It was the nations thirteenth appearance at the Summer Olympics, since its debut in 1964. Congolese athletes did not attend the 1968 Summer Olympics in Mexico City, and the 1976 Summer Olympics in Montreal because of the African boycott.

Competitors
The following is the list of number of competitors in the Games.

Athletics

Congo received the universality slots from the World Athletics to send two athletes (one male and one female) to the Olympics.

Track & road events

Swimming

Congo received a universality invitation from FINA to send a top-ranked female swimmer in her respective individual events to the Olympics, based on the FINA Points System of June 28, 2021.

References

External links
 Congo at the 2020 Summer Olympics at Olympedia

Olympics
2020
Nations at the 2020 Summer Olympics